Woodlake, California is a city in the San Joaquin Valley.

Woodlake may also refer to:

Places and locations 
 Woodlake, Dorset, a location in the UK
 Woodlake, Texas, US
 Woodlake, Virginia, US
 A neighborhood in North Sacramento, California, US

Other 
 Bill Woodlake, a fictional character in Halloween: Resurrection
 Woodlake, thoroughbred horse and winner of the 1903 Latonia Derby

See also
 Wood Lake (disambiguation)